Acropora speciosa is a species of acroporid coral found in the Red Sea, the Gulf of Aden, the southwest and northern Indian Ocean, the central Indo-Pacific, Southeast Asia, Japan, the East China Sea, eastern Australia and the oceanic west and central Pacific Ocean.

Description
This species occurs in table-shaped colonies with diameters sometime beyond . Its horizontal branches are irregularly arranged. Axial corallites are tube-shaped and long, and radial corallites are triangular and have nariform openings; they are immersed on the species' main branches. It is pale brown in colour and has a similar appearance to Acropora batunai, Acropora echinata, and Acropora granulosa.

Distribution
This species is classed as a data deficient species on the IUCN Red List, but it is believed that its population is decreasing in line with the global decline in coral reefs, and it is listed under Appendix II of CITES. Figures of its population are unknown, but is likely to be threatened by the global reduction of coral reefs, the increase of temperature causing coral bleaching, climate change, human activity, the crown-of-thorns starfish (Acanthaster planci) and disease. It occurs in the Red Sea, the Gulf of Aden, the southwest and northern Indian Ocean, the central Indo-Pacific, Southeast Asia, Japan, the East China Sea, eastern Australia and the oceanic west and central Pacific Ocean.

Taxonomy
It was originally described by Quelch in 1886.

References

Acropora
Animals described in 1890